The Christian Appalachian Project (CAP) is an interdenominational non-profit organization whose mission is "building hope, transforming lives, and sharing Christ's love through service in Appalachia".

CAP was started in 1964 by Father Ralph W. Beiting. It is headquartered in Paintsville, Kentucky.

As the 12th-largest human services charity in the United States, Christian Appalachian Project (CAP) served over 36,000 eastern Kentuckians in the last fiscal year.  In addition, CAP's gift in kind program called Operation Sharing, provided assistance in all thirteen Appalachian states, reaching over 1 million people.  Following its faith-based principles, CAP is helped by donors, volunteers, staff and the community to provide a variety of programs that have proven successful in helping people help themselves. CAP concerns stewardship and innovation.

Operation Sharing is CAP's farthest-reaching mission, giving away over $100 million in gift-in-kind donations to more than 1,400 partner agencies and churches in Appalachia in 2010. CAP receives donations from corporations and individuals and uses the goods to offset costs of its human services missions, to give to other charities and to give to victims of natural disasters. Through Operation Relief, a component of Operation Sharing, CAP gives millions of dollars' worth of emergency supplies to those devastated by tornadoes, floods, hurricanes, and other natural disasters. CAP's disaster services also supplies teams of relief workers who assist victims with physical labor involved in recovering from disasters.

External links
 
 Christian Appalachian Oral History Project at the Louie B. Nunn Center for Oral History
 

Society of Appalachia
Religious charities based in the United States
Charities based in Kentucky
Social welfare charities based in the United States
Paintsville, Kentucky